The Macau Open Badminton Championships is an open international championship in badminton held in Macau since 2006.

In 2007, the tournament was categorised by the Badminton World Federation as Grand Prix Gold level event, which carried a total prize money of US$120,000.

Previous winners

Performances by nation

References

External links
Official Website
BWF: 2014 Macau Open Badminton Grand Prix Gold

 
Badminton tournaments in China
Badminton in Macau
Sports competitions in Macau